Sultanpur Junction railway station is a largest and most important railway station in Sultanpur district, Uttar Pradesh. Its code is SLN. It serves Sultanpur city. The station consists of four platforms. The main line of the Oudh and Rohilkhand Railway from Sultanpur to Lucknow, Varanasi, Faizabad, Jaunpur, and Allahabad serves the south-western portion.

Trains 

Some of the trains that runs from Sultanpur are:

 Lucknow–Mau Express
 Ghazipur City–Shri Mata Vaishno Devi Katra Weekly Express
 Upper India Express
 Lokmanya Tilak Terminus–Sultanpur Express
 Mahamana Express
 Suhaildev Superfast Express
 Begampura Express
 Himgiri Superfast Express
 Akal Takht Express
 Indore–Patna Express
 Marudhar Express (via Sultanpur)
 Dr. Ambedkar Nagar–Kamakhya Weekly Express
 Ahmedabad–Sultanpur Weekly Express
 Ahmedabad–Varanasi Weekly Express
 Varanasi–Sultanpur Passenger
 Howrah–Amritsar Express
 Patliputra–Chandigarh Superfast Express
 Manwar Sangam Express
 Saryu Express

See also 

 Kerakat railway station
 Varanasi Junction railway station
 Ghazipur City railway station
 Varanasi–Jaunpur City–Sultanpur–Lucknow line

References

External links 

 SLN/Sultanpur Junction

Railway stations in Sultanpur district
Sultanpur, Uttar Pradesh
Lucknow NR railway division
Transport in Sultanpur, Uttar Pradesh